Dunstan Bruce (born 31 December 1960) is an English musician and filmmaker who is perhaps best known for his work with Leeds-based anarcho-pop band Chumbawamba, of which he was a founding member. He grew up in the northern industrial town of Billingham.

Career

Musician
Prior to Chumbawamba, Bruce sang for the Billingham-based band Men in a Suitcase. At the beginning of 1982, Bruce joined Chumbawamba and was the lead singer of the band's biggest hit single, "Tubthumping". Bruce left Chumbawamba at the end of 2004 after struggles and a rivalry with Boff Whalley, and the band eventually split up in 2012.

Bruce is the lead singer of Interrobang?!, an agitprop post-punk band he formed in 2012 with ex-Chumbawamba drummer Harry Hamer and ex-Regular Fries guitarist Stephen Griffin. They released a critically acclaimed eponymous album in 2018.

Bruce performs spoken word pieces accompanied by music as The Existential Angst of Dunstan Bruce.

Filmmaker
Bruce has worked in filmmaking, producing a soundtrack for Channel 4's Whatever: A Teenage Musical and several documentary films, including one about his experience in Chumbawamba called Well Done, Now Sod Off, which won the audience prize at Leeds International Film Festival.  In 2012, Bruce directed a movie about the punk group Sham 69's tour of China called This Band Is So Gorgeous, which was nominated for the "Best Music Documentary" at IDFA in 2012. In 2014 he directed the music documentary A Curious Life. about the folk-punk band Levellers.

Bruce is making a documentary, I Get Knocked Down, about his experience in Chumbawamba and his subsequent determination to remain active politically and creatively.

References

External links 
 
 
 

1960 births
Living people
English punk rock singers
English rock singers
People from Billingham
English anarchists